Platyschkuhria integrifolia, the basindaisy, is a perennial plant in the genus Platyschkuhria of the sunflower family (Asteraceae) found in the Colorado Plateau and Canyonlands region of the southwestern United States.

It grows in clay soils in desert shrub, pinyon juniper woodland, and mountain brush communities.

References

Bahieae
Flora of the United States
Plants described in 1874